Built to Last is a 2012 album by The Rippingtons.

Track listing
All songs written by Russ Freeman, except Track 11 written by Russ Freeman and Yaredt Leon.

"Built to Last" - 5:30
"American Panorama" - 3:20
"Fool's Gold" - 3:50
"Hotel Deville" - 4:41
"Cougars & Gigolos" - 4:14
"Route 66" - 3:23
"In the Shadow of Giants" - 4:08
"Black Oak" - 4:29
"We Made A New World" - 3:20
"Monument/Monolith" - 5:58
"Firefly" - 4:27
"Built to Last (Classical Guitar Reprise)" - 1:50
Bonus Tracks
"Fool's Gold (Orchestral)" - 2:59
"Black Oak (Orchestral)" - 3:20
"Hotel Deville (Orchestral)" - 2:55
"Built to Last (Orchestral)" - 3:33

Personnel 
 Russ Freeman – guitars, keyboards, programming
 Bill Heller – acoustic piano 
 Zakk Wylde – guitar solo (10)
 Rico Belled – bass
 Dave Karasony – drums
 Jeff Kashiwa – saxophone (6, 11)

Production 
 Russ Freeman – producer, executive producer, arrangements, recording, mixing, liner notes 
 Andi Howard – executive producer, management
 Adam Klumpp – additional engineer (guitar solo on Track 10)
 Bernie Grundman – mastering 
 Paul Grosso – creative director 
 Sean Marlowe – art direction, design 
 Bill Mayer – cover art illustration

Studios
 Recorded and Mixed at Surfboard Studios (Marina del Rey, California).
 Mastered at Bernie Grundman Mastering (Hollywood, California).

The Rippingtons albums
2012 albums